Wrestling Reality was a documentary television series created by independent filmmaker Greg Hemmings, airing on The Fight Network. It followed the lives of a group of independent professional wrestlers in the Maritime provinces of Canada. The series consisted of a half-hour documentary portion, as well as an hour of televised matches and shoot interviews. A sneak peek of the premiere episode aired September 25, 2007, with the full series then airing in early November. The series tackled many behind-the-scenes issues in professional wrestling including drugs, steroids, and sex. The colour commentary and play-by-play was provided by 89.3 K-Rock announcer/Eastlink host Darrin Harvey. The show also airs in the United Kingdom on TWC Fight!.

Cast

Main participants

Other participants

See also

Professional wrestling in Canada
List of professional wrestling television series

References

External links

The official website of Wrestling Reality
MaritimeWrestling.com
The Fight Network
Wildman Academy

2000s Canadian reality television series
2000s Canadian documentary television series
Professional wrestling in Canada
Professional wrestling television series